Victor H. Denenberg (April 3, 1925 – July 19, 2008) was an American developmental psychobiologist. He obtained his Ph.D. in 1953 from Purdue University, where he became assistant professor and remained through 1969. In 1969 he became a professor at the University of Connecticut at Storrs, in the newly formed program in Biobehavioral Sciences, of which he was the head from 1984 to 2000. After his retirement in 2000, he became a professor emeritus at the University of Washington. Denenberg published over 400 scholarly papers and book chapters and trained over 70 M.S. and Ph.D. students.  He was an academic icon of his era.

References 

1925 births
2008 deaths
University of Connecticut faculty
University of Washington faculty
Purdue University faculty
Purdue University alumni
American biologists
20th-century biologists